John Droney is a Connecticut politician and lawyer. He is the senior partner of Levy & Droney, a law firm based in Farmington, Connecticut, U.S.A.

Career
A native of West Hartford, Connecticut, Droney is a graduate of College of the Holy Cross and the University of Connecticut School of Law.  He is former Chairman of the Connecticut Democratic State Central Committee and was a member of the Democratic National Committee. He was co-chair of the Bill Clinton-Al Gore campaign in Connecticut. Droney has usually been aligned with more conservative Connecticut Democrats such as former Governor William O'Neill.

In 2006 Droney was a vocal supporter of the re-election of his political ally, Senator Joe Lieberman. Early in the year he publicly urged Lieberman to forgo a Democratic party primary and seek reelection as an independent. Droney's strategy was vindicated when, after Lieberman lost the primary to Ned Lamont, Lieberman won re-election as an independent candidate.

His brother, Christopher F. Droney, is a judge on the United States Court of Appeals for the Second Circuit.

Sources

References

Year of birth missing (living people)
Living people
College of the Holy Cross alumni
People from West Hartford, Connecticut
Connecticut Democrats